Floyd Eugene Sagely (March 26, 1932 – September 22, 2021) was an American football player who played for San Francisco 49ers  and Chicago Cardinals of the National Football League (NFL). He played college football at the University of Arkansas.

References

1932 births
2021 deaths
American football defensive backs
San Francisco 49ers players
Chicago Cardinals players
Arkansas Razorbacks football players
Arkansas Razorbacks men's basketball players
People from Crawford County, Arkansas